The following is a list of massacres that have occurred in Libya (numbers may be approximate):

References

External links
 Libya: 'Mass killing' sites in Tripoli

Libya
Massacres

Massacres